Valerii Fedorovych Zaluzhnyi (born 8 July 1973) is a Ukrainian four-star general who has served as the Commander-in-Chief of the Armed Forces of Ukraine since 27 July 2021. He is also concurrently a member  of the National Security and Defense Council of Ukraine.

Zaluzhnyi was the Commander of the North Operational Command (2019–2021), Chief of the Joint Operational Staff of the Armed Forces of Ukraine — First Deputy Commander of the Joint Forces (2018), Chief of Staff – First Deputy Commander of the West Operational Command (2017), and Commander of the 51st Guards Mechanized Brigade (2009–2012).

Zaluzhnyi was named by Time magazine as one of the 100 most influential people in the world in 2022. He has received praise for his skill at "adapting to a fast-changing battlefield" through effective delegation and information gathering during the 2022 Russian invasion of Ukraine.

Biography 
In 1989, Zaluzhnyi graduated from the city school No. 9 and entered the Zviahel Machine-Building Technical School, from which he graduated in 1991 with honors. He later entered the general military faculty of the Odesa Institute of Land Forces. In 1997, he graduated with honors from the institute, after which he passed all stages of military service: platoon commander, training platoon commander, combat platoon commander, training company commander, cadet company commander, and battalion commander.

In 2005, he entered the National Academy of Defense of Ukraine. In 2007, he graduated with a gold medal and was appointed Chief of Staff and First Deputy Commander of the 24th Mechanized Brigade in Yavoriv, Lviv Oblast. He successfully served in this position for two and a half years. By the decision of the Chief of the General Staff of the Armed Forces of Ukraine on 13 October 2009, he was appointed commander of the 51st Mechanized Brigade. He commanded it until 2012.

In 2014, Zaluzhnyi graduated from the Ivan Cherniakhovskyi National Defense University of Ukraine. As the best graduate of the operational and strategic level of training, he was awarded the Transitional Sword of the Queen of Great Britain . In 2017, he was appointed Chief of Staff – First Deputy Commander of the Operational Command West. The next year, in 2018, Zaluzhnyi was appointed Chief of the Joint Operational Staff of the Armed Forces of Ukraine – First Deputy Commander of the Joint Forces.

On 9 December 2019, he was appointed Commander of the Operational Command North. In December 2020 he graduated from the National University Ostroh Academy with a master's degree in International Relations. On 27 July 2021, President Volodymyr Zelenskyy appointed Zaluzhnyi as Commander-in-Chief of the Armed Forces of Ukraine, replacing General Ruslan Khomchak in this position. The following day he was also appointed as a member of the National Security and Defense Council of Ukraine.

Zaluzhnyi is widely regarded as an open-minded officer. Representing a new generation of Ukrainian officers, Zaluzhnyi has radically departed from established Soviet military practices. One of his first steps in office was to allow the military at the front to open fire in response to the enemy without the consent of the upper leadership and eliminate the need for the military to fill out unnecessary documents.

Regarding his priorities as Commander-in-Chief, Zaluzhnyi said: "The overall course of reforming Ukraine's Armed Forces in line with NATO principles and standards remains irreversible. And the key here is the principles. Changes must take place primarily in the worldview and attitude toward people. I would like you to turn your face to the people, to your subordinates. My attitude towards people has not changed throughout my service."

On 5 March 2022, in the midst of the Russian invasion of Ukraine, Zaluzhnyi was promoted by President Zelenskyy to the rank of General, the highest possible rank in the Ukrainian Armed Forces. International experts and analysts have given Zaluzhnyi high marks for the effectiveness of his command at the front against the Russian military, in particular in Time magazine.

In January 2023, Valeriy Zaluzhny received $1 million USD as an inheritance from an American-Ukrainian, Gregory Stepants. General Zaluzhny donated the $1 million to the Ukrainian Armed Forces and humanitarian nonprofits in Ukraine.

Military ranks 
 Major general (23 August 2017)
 Lieutenant general (24 August 2021)
 General (4 March 2022)

Notes

References

Information 
 генерал-лейтенант ЗАЛУЖНИЙ Валерій Федорович // zsu.gov.ua
 Gen. Mark A. Milley and Gen. Valery Zaluzhny; Washington Post, 27 January 2023

Interviews 
 
 Олександр Штупун, «Хочемо відійти від написання бойових наказів зразка 1943 року. Від цих безглуздих доповідей біля карт» — командувач військ ОК «Північ» генерал-майор Валерій Залужний // armyinform.com.ua, 15 February 2020.

External links 

 General Valerii Zaluzhnyi, Official Biography - Ministry of Defense of Ukraine
 Хто такий новий головнокомандувач ЗСУ Валерій Залужний // Радіо Свобода, 27 July 2021.
 «Кожен солдат для мене — особистість». Принципи нового головнокомандувача ЗСУ Валерія Залужного // Новинарня, 27 July 2021.

Ivan Chernyakhovsky National Defense University of Ukraine alumni
1973 births
Generals of the Army (Ukraine)
Living people
People from Zviahel
Ukrainian military personnel of the 2022 Russian invasion of Ukraine